"Meu Erro" (Portuguese for "My Mistake") is a rock single by Os Paralamas do Sucesso that was a Brazilian hit. It was released in 1985, with great success among the Brazilian youth. Cover versions included two recorded by CPM 22 and Banda do Santa.

In 1999, an acoustic version by Brazilian singer Zizi Possi, included on her album Puro Prazer, was nominated for a Latin Grammy Award for Best Female Pop Vocal Performance.

References

1985 singles
Brazilian songs
Portuguese-language songs
1985 songs
Song articles with missing songwriters